Víctor Hugo Morales Pérez (born 26 December 1947 in Cardona, Uruguay) is a Uruguayan journalist, pundit and writer who has lived and worked in Argentina since 1981. As a football commentator, he has been regarded as one of the best in the Spanish-speaking world. In Argentina his commentary on Diego Maradona's second goal in the 1986 World Cup quarter-final was widely praised.

He is a staunch supporter of former President Cristina Fernández de Kirchner.

Awards
Morales was awarded the 2011 Illustrious Citizen of the City of Buenos Aires Medal  and the Rodolfo Walsh Prize.

Selected works
El intruso. Montevideo: Ediciones de la Plaza, 1979. 		
Un grito en el desierto. Buenos Aires: Editorial Sudamericana, 1998.
Papel Prensa, el grupo de tareas Medios, jueces y militares en la mayor estafa del pais Ediciones Colihue, 2017.
La batalla cultural. Mentiras, infamias y omisiones del monopolio mediático Ediciones Colihue, 2020.
El reproche. Drama, 2022.

References

1947 births
Living people
People from Soriano Department
Uruguayan male writers
Uruguayan journalists
Uruguayan sports journalists
Association football commentators
Uruguayan expatriates in Argentina